Mikhail Zakharovich Shufutinsky (born 13 April 1948) is a Russian pop singer. He was once a citizen of the United States from 1990 to 2003, but now lives in Russia. He is currently the pre-eminent singer of Russian chanson music. He was awarded the title of Meritorious Artist of Russia in 2013. In January 2023, Ukraine imposed sanctions on Mikhail for his support of 2022 Russian invasion of Ukraine.

Biography
Shufutinsky was born on 13 April 1948 in Moscow. His father, Zakhar Davidovich Shufutinski, was a Jewish World War II doctor and veteran. When he was five years old, his mother died and he was then raised by his grandmother, Berta Davidovna, and his grandfather, David Yakovlevich.

Majoring in the accordion, Shufutinsky graduated from the Ippolitov-Ivanov State Musical Pedagogical Institute with a specialization in the choral Coryphaeus style.

He appeared with different bands in Moscow and Magadan,  performing songs by Alexander Vertinsky and Pyotr Leshchenko, and later became leader of the instrumental band "Leisya, Pesnia", which usually played songs by Vyacheslav Dobrynin.

At some point, Mikhail visited Los Angeles for a concert and immediately fell in love with the city. This was during the boom of the Russian restaurant business in Los Angeles. As a famous singer and musician, Shufutinsky was offered a job in the Arbat restaurant in Burbank, California. Shufutinsky had surprising success as an immigrant performer despite American expectations against Russians.

In 1981, Shufutinsky and his family immigrated to the USA. Within 10 years, he had appeared with many bands in different restaurants, and created his own show, "Ataman-band" (named after the restaurant Ataman). Nowadays, he regularly tours in Russia. In 1990, he accepted an invitation to visit Russia and sang concerts in 75 sold-out stadiums.

In 1998, Shufutinsky wrote an autobiography named  ("Here I stand at a line").

In 2003, Shufutinsky returned to Russia as a permanent resident.

His repertoire contains songs by songwriters Vyacheslav Dobrynin ("Two candles" []), Igor Krutoy ("The 3rd of September" []; "Palma de Mallorca"; "Moscow taxi" []; "Moscow doesn’t believe in tears" []), Oleg Mityaev ("Night guest" []), Aleksandr Rozenbaum ("Khreschatik", "Zakhodite k nam na ogoniok" - "Visit our place", "Gop-stop"), Oleg Gazmanov, Igor Zubkov, Vatslav Lisovskii, Olesia Atlanova, Karen Kavaleryan, and many others.

Discography

Filmography

Roles
1984 — Moscow on the Hudson as an unnamed restaurant singer.

Soundtracks
2012 — Brave — King Fergus (Russian dubbing; originally voiced by Billy Connolly)
2014 — Vacation of Little Nicole — director of school (original voice - Francis Perren)

Books
1997 — Михаил Шуфутинский. «И вот стою я у черты...» (Here I stand at a line) (Thrien publishing — )
2004 — Михаил Шуфутинский. «Лучшие песни. Тексты и аккорды» (Best songs. Texts and accords)
2021 — Даниил Ветлужских, Влад Максименко. «3 сентября» (The 3rd of September)

Recognition and awards
1997 — Silver Rubber Shoe Award «Серебряная калоша»
2013 — Honorary title of recognized Russian performer («Заслуженный артист Российской Федерации»), for artistic achievements.

Sanctions 
In January 2023 Ukraine imposed sanctions on Mikhail Shufutinsky for promoting Russia during the 2022 Russian invasion of Ukraine.

References

External links
Shufutinsky's home page
Biography at Foreign Language School ZNATOK

1948 births
Living people
Russian chanson
20th-century Russian male singers
20th-century Russian singers
21st-century Russian male singers
21st-century Russian singers
Russian Jews
Singers from Moscow
Russian record producers
Honored Artists of the Russian Federation
Soviet male singers